"Give It 2 You" is the third and final single released from Da Brat's debut album, Funkdafied, the first album from a female rapper to go platinum.

Background
Produced by Jermaine Dupri and Manuel Seal, Jr., who used a sample of the Mary Jane Girls' "All Night Long", "Give It 2 You" was the final single from Da Brat's platinum-certified album Funkdafied after "Funkdafied" (#6 US) and "Fa All Y'all" (#37 US). It was released in October 1994 and became her third consecutive top 40 hit, peaking at No. 26 on the Billboard Hot 100, and her second to earn a RIAA certification, reaching gold status on June 14, 1996 for sales of 500,000 copies.

Music video
The music video was directed by Michael Merriman premiered on BET, MTV & VH1 in 1995. The song's music video featured appearances from Jermaine Dupri, Kris Kross, MC Lyte, The Notorious B.I.G., Sean "Puffy" Combs, Mary J. Blige, Keith Murray, Goodie Mob, Too Short, T-Boz and Bill Bellamy, among others. The video also featured audio samples of "Smooth Criminal" by Michael Jackson, and Da Brat's song "Da B Side", which featured The Notorious B.I.G. and Jermaine Dupri.

Single track listing

A-Side
"Give It 2 You" (Extended Radio Edit)- 3:51
"Give It 2 You" (EP Version)- 3:09
"Give It 2 You" (Remix Instrumental)- 3:53

B-Side
"Give It 2 You" (LP Version)- 3:12
"Give It 2 You" (Dirty Remix Version)- 3:53
"Give It 2 You" (LP Instrumental)- 3:12

Charts

Weekly charts

Year-end charts

Certifications

References

1994 singles
Da Brat songs
Song recordings produced by Jermaine Dupri
Songs written by Jermaine Dupri
1994 songs
Songs written by Da Brat
So So Def Recordings singles